Bovell may refer to:

Andrew Bovell (born 1962), Australian playwright
Brian Bovell (born 1959), English actor, appeared in Gimme Gimme Gimme
Dennis Bovell (born 1953), British guitarist and producer
George Bovell (born 1983), swimmer from Trinidad and Tobago, older brother of Nicholas Bovell
James Bovell (born 1817), Canadian physician
Kalena Bovell, American conductor
Nicholas Bovell (born 1986), swimmer from Trinidad and Tobago, younger brother of George Bovell
Penny Bovell, Australian artist and art historian
Ryan Bovell (born 1974), cricketer from Barbados

See also

Bovill (disambiguation)